Daniel Preston Hooker (born 13 February 1990) is a New Zealand mixed martial artist. He currently competes in the Lightweight division in the Ultimate Fighting Championship (UFC). Hooker was the King in the Ring Middleweight Kickboxing Champion and WKBF X-Rules Welterweight Champion. As of November 15, 2022, he is #11 in the UFC lightweight rankings.

Mixed martial arts career

Early career 
Hooker made his professional mixed martial arts debut in March 2009. He fought primarily in his native New Zealand and amassed a record of 10–4 before joining the Ultimate Fighting Championship.

Dan is also a professional kickboxer with a 9–1–3 record, winning the King In The Ring Middleweight Kickboxing Championship and WKBF X-Rules Welterweight Championship.

Hooker also has a 3–2 submission grappling record. On 18 October 2009 he took part in the ICNZ Contender Series 1 No-Gi Submission Wrestling Tournament. He beat Thomas Kwok and Bass Khou by guillotine choke and lost to Pumau Campbell on points. He also competed in the New Zealand 2011 No-Gi Nationals, in the Advanced under 77 kg / 170 lbs division, he beat Paul Faavaoga in the first round and lost to LJ Stevenson in the second round.

He has also competed in a heavyweight fight, for which he weighed in at 86 kg / 189 lbs, against Mark Creedy, winning by knockout in the second round. He also competed in a heavyweight tag team kickboxing match against Antz Nansen.

Hooker has been coaching MMA since 2008, spending time as head coach at City Kickboxing gym in Auckland. In mid 2018 Hooker opened his own gym Combat Academy in Ellerslie, Auckland, a state-of-the-art gym that included a full-sized boxing ring and an octagon.

Ultimate Fighting Championship

2014 
Hooker made his promotional debut against fellow newcomer Ian Entwistle on 28 June 2014 at UFC Fight Night 43. Hooker won the back-and-forth fight via TKO in the first round.

Hooker faced Maximo Blanco on 20 September 2014 at UFC Fight Night 52. Hooker lost the fight via unanimous decision.

2015 
Hooker faced Hatsu Hioki on 10 May 2015 at UFC Fight Night 65. He won the fight via knockout due to a combination of head kick and punches in the second round.  With this win, he became the first man to knock out Hioki in a MMA fight. The win also earned Hooker his first Performance of the Night bonus award.

Hooker next faced Yair Rodríguez on 3 October 2015 at UFC 192. He lost the fight by unanimous decision.

2016 
Hooker next faced Mark Eddiva on 20 March 2016 at UFC Fight Night 85. He won the fighting from a high-elbow mounted guillotine choke in the first round.

Hooker faced Jason Knight on 27 November 2016 at UFC Fight Night 101. He lost the fight via unanimous decision.

2017 
Moving up from featherweight to lightweight, Hooker fought Ross Pearson on 11 June 2017 at UFC Fight Night 110. He trained locally in City Kickboxing in Newton, Auckland. He won the fight via knockout in the second round. The win also earned Hooker his second Performance of the Night bonus award.

Hooker faced Marc Diakiese on 30 December 2017 at UFC 219 He won the fight via guillotine choke submission in the third round.

2018 
Hooker faced Jim Miller on 21 April 2018 at UFC Fight Night 128. He won the fight via knockout in round one.

Hooker faced Gilbert Burns on 7 July 2018 at UFC 226. He won the fight via knockout in round one.

Hooker faced Edson Barboza on 15 December 2018 at UFC on Fox 31. Hooker lost the fight via TKO.

2019 
Hooker faced James Vick on 20 July 2019 at UFC on ESPN 4. He won the fight via knockout in the first round. This win earned him the Performance of the Night bonus.

Hooker faced former UFC title challenger Al Iaquinta on 6 October 2019 at UFC 243. He won the fight via unanimous decision.

2020 
Hooker faced Paul Felder on 23 February 2020 at UFC Fight Night: Felder vs. Hooker. Hooker won the fight by a controversial split decision. Out of 17 media members, 12 scored it for Felder, and only 4 for Hooker. This fight earned him a Fight of the Night award.

Hooker faced returning UFC title challenger Dustin Poirier on 27 June 2020 at UFC on ESPN: Poirier vs. Hooker. He lost the fight via unanimous decision. This contest earned him the Fight of the Night award. This bout was widely considered one of the greatest fights of the year, due its back-and-forth bloody exchanges.

2021 
Hooker faced former three-time Bellator MMA lightweight champion and UFC newcomer Michael Chandler at UFC 257 on 24 January 2021. He lost the fight via technical knockout in the first round. After the bout, Hooker placed his gloves in the middle of the octagon as a sign of retirement. However, he then clarified that after reconsideration, he would not retire from the sport.

Hooker faced Nasrat Haqparast on 25 September 2021 at UFC 266. He won the fight via unanimous decision.

Hooker faced Islam Makhachev as a short notice replacement for Rafael Dos Anjos at UFC 267. He lost the bout via submission due to a kimura in round one.

2022 
Hooker faced Arnold Allen in a featherweight bout on 19 March 2022 at UFC Fight Night 204.  He lost the fight via technical knockout in the first round.

Hooker faced Claudio Puelles on November 12, 2022, at UFC 281. He won the fight via technical knockout in the second round.

2023 

Hooker was scheduled to face Jalin Turner on March 4, 2023, at UFC 285. However, Hooker was forced to withdraw from the event citing a hand injury, and he was replaced by Mateusz Gamrot.

Personal life 
Hooker runs and teaches mixed martial arts at his own gym The Combat Academy in Auckland, New Zealand. In September 2021, Hooker announced that he was relocating to the United States due to problems he experienced with lockdown measures in New Zealand as well as obtaining a work visa to travel to the US from NZ.

Championships and accomplishments

Mixed martial arts 
Ultimate Fighting Championship
 Performance of the Night (Three times) 
 Fight of the Night (Two times) 
Australian Fighting Championship
 AFC Lightweight Championship (One time)
 Two successful title defenses
Supremacy Fighting Championships
 New Zealand Lightweight Championship
MMAJunkie.com
2015 May Knockout of the Month vs. Hatsu Hioki
2020 February Fight of the Month vs. Paul Felder
2020 June Fight of the Month vs. Dustin Poirier

Kickboxing
World Kickboxing Federation 
WKBF X-Rules Welterweight Championship 

King in the Ring
King in the Ring Middleweight Championship

Mixed martial arts record 

|-
|Win
|align=center|22–12
|Claudio Puelles
|TKO (body kick)
|UFC 281
| 
|align=center|2
|align=center|4:06
|New York City, New York, United States
|
|-
|Loss
|align=center|21–12
|Arnold Allen
|TKO (punches and elbows)
|UFC Fight Night: Volkov vs. Aspinall
|
|align=center|1
|align=center|2:33
|London, England
|
|-
|Loss
|align=center|21–11
|Islam Makhachev 
|Submission (kimura)
|UFC 267 
|
|align=center|1
|align=center|2:25
|Abu Dhabi, United Arab Emirates
|  
|-
|Win
|align=center|21–10
|Nasrat Haqparast
|Decision (unanimous)
|UFC 266
|
|align=center|3
|align=center|5:00
|Las Vegas, Nevada, United States
|
|-
|Loss
|align=center|20–10
|Michael Chandler
|TKO (punches)
|UFC 257
|
|align=center|1
|align=center|2:30
|Abu Dhabi, United Arab Emirates
|
|-
|Loss
|align=center|20–9
|Dustin Poirier
|Decision (unanimous)
|UFC on ESPN: Poirier vs. Hooker
|
|align=center|5
|align=center|5:00
|Las Vegas, Nevada, United States
|
|-
|Win
|align=center|20–8
|Paul Felder
|Decision (split)
|UFC Fight Night: Felder vs. Hooker
|
|align=center|5
|align=center|5:00
|Auckland, New Zealand
|
|-
|Win
|align=center|19–8
|Al Iaquinta
|Decision (unanimous)
|UFC 243
|
|align=center|3
|align=center|5:00
|Melbourne, Australia
|
|-
|Win
|align=center|18–8
|James Vick
|KO (punch)
|UFC on ESPN: dos Anjos vs. Edwards
|
|align=center|1
|align=center|2:33
|San Antonio, Texas, United States
|
|-
|Loss
|align=center|17–8
|Edson Barboza
|KO (punch to the body)
|UFC on Fox: Lee vs. Iaquinta 2
|
|align=center|3
|align=center|2:19
|Milwaukee, Wisconsin, United States
|
|-
|Win
|align=center|17–7
|Gilbert Burns
|KO (punches)
|UFC 226
|
|align=center|1
|align=center|2:28
|Las Vegas, Nevada, United States
|
|-
|Win
|align=center|16–7
|Jim Miller
|KO (knee)
|UFC Fight Night: Barboza vs. Lee
|
|align=center|1
|align=center|3:00
|Atlantic City, New Jersey, United States
|
|-
|Win
|align=center|15–7
|Marc Diakiese
|Submission (guillotine choke)
|UFC 219
|
|align=center|3
|align=center|0:42
|Las Vegas, Nevada, United States
|
|-
|Win
|align=center|14–7
|Ross Pearson
|KO (knee)
|UFC Fight Night: Lewis vs. Hunt
|
|align=center|2
|align=center|3:02
|Auckland, New Zealand
|
|-
|Loss
|align=center|13–7
|Jason Knight
|Decision (unanimous)
|UFC Fight Night: Whittaker vs. Brunson
|
|align=center|3
|align=center|5:00
|Melbourne, Australia
|
|-
|Win
|align=center|13–6
|Mark Eddiva
|Submission (guillotine choke)
|UFC Fight Night: Hunt vs. Mir
|
|align=center|1
|align=center|1:24
|Brisbane, Australia
|
|-
|Loss
|align=center|12–6
|Yair Rodríguez
|Decision (unanimous)
|UFC 192
|
|align=center|3
|align=center|5:00
|Houston, Texas, United States
|
|-
|Win
|align=center|12–5
|Hatsu Hioki
|KO (head kick and punches)
|UFC Fight Night: Miocic vs. Hunt
|
|align=center|2
|align=center|4:13
|Adelaide, Australia
|
|-
|Loss
|align=center|11–5
|Maximo Blanco
|Decision (unanimous)
|UFC Fight Night: Hunt vs. Nelson
|
|align=center|3
|align=center|5:00
|Saitama, Japan
|
|-
|Win
|align=center|11–4
|Ian Entwistle
|TKO (elbows)
|UFC Fight Night: Te Huna vs. Marquardt
|
|align=center|1
|align=center|3:34
|Auckland, New Zealand
|
|-
|Win
|align=center|10–4
|Nick Patterson
|TKO (punches)
|AFC 6
|
|align=center|3
|align=center|0:34
|Melbourne, Australia
|
|-
|Win
|align=center|9–4
|Rusty McBride
|Submission (rear-naked choke)
|AFC 5
|
|align=center|1
|align=center|1:31
|Melbourne, Australia
|
|-
|Win
|align=center|8–4
|Sihle Khuboni
|Submission (triangle choke)
|Shuriken MMA: Clash of the Continents
|
|align=center|1
|align=center|2:53
|Auckland, New Zealand
|
|-
|Win
|align=center|7–4
|Chengjie Wu
|TKO (doctor stoppage)
|Legend FC 9
|
|align=center|1
|align=center|3:44
| Macau, SAR, China
|
|-
|Win
|align=center|6–4
|Rusty McBride
|TKO (doctor stoppage)
|AFC 3
|
|align=center|2
|align=center|3:57
|Melbourne, Australia
|
|-
|Loss
|align=center|5–4
|Haotian Wu
|Submission (rear-naked choke)
|Legend FC 8
|
|align=center|2
|align=center|4:52
| Hong Kong, SAR, China
|
|-
|Win
|align=center|5–3
|Yuma Ishizuka
|Decision (unanimous)
|AFC 2
|
|align=center|3
|align=center|5:00
|Melbourne, Australia
|
|-
|Win
|align=center|4–3
|Scott MacGregor
|Submission (guillotine choke)
|SFC 8
|
|align=center|1
|align=center|4:42
|Auckland, New Zealand
|
|-
|Loss
|align=center|3–3
|Rob Lisita
|Decision (split)
|SCF 6
|
|align=center|3
|align=center|5:00
|Dunedin, New Zealand
|
|-
|Loss
|align=center|3–2
|Sonny Brown
|Submission (rear-naked choke)
|Rize 4
|
|align=center|2
|align=center|2:00
|Fortitude Valley, Australia
|
|-
|Win
|align=center|3–1
|Ken Yasuda
|TKO (eye injury)
|Rize 3
|
|align=center|1
|align=center|3:12
|Mansfield, Australia
|
|-
|Win
|align=center|2–1
|Adam Calver
|Submission (armbar)
|SCF 4
|
|align=center|1
|align=center|2:52
|Auckland, New Zealand
|
|-
|Loss
|align=center|1–1
|Adam Calver
|Decision (split)
|SCF 3
|
|align=center|3
|align=center|5:00
|Auckland, New Zealand
|
|-
|Win
|align=center|1–0
|Mike Taylor
|Submission (rear-naked choke)
|SCF 2
|
|align=center|1
|align=center|0:48
|Auckland, New Zealand
|
|-

Kickboxing record (incomplete)

|-  bgcolor="#cfc"
| 2013-07-13 || Win||align=left|  Edwin Samy || King in the Ring 72MAX, Final|| Auckland, New Zealand || KO (left hook to the body) || 1|| 0:55
|-
! style=background:white colspan=9 |

|-  bgcolor="#cfc"
| 2013-07-13 || Win||align=left| Victor Mechkov || King in the Ring 72MAX, Semi Final|| Auckland, New Zealand || KO (punches) || 3|| 2:16

|-
| colspan=9 | Legend:

See also 
 List of current UFC fighters
 List of male mixed martial artists

References

External links 

Living people
1990 births
New Zealand male mixed martial artists
Featherweight mixed martial artists
Lightweight mixed martial artists
Mixed martial artists utilizing kickboxing
Mixed martial artists utilizing Brazilian jiu-jitsu
Sportspeople from Auckland
Ultimate Fighting Championship male fighters
New Zealand male kickboxers
New Zealand practitioners of Brazilian jiu-jitsu